Bowyer Butte is a steep-cliffed eminence with a nearly flat summit,  wide and  high, located between the lower ends of the Johnson Glacier and the Venzke Glacier on the coast of Marie Byrd Land. It was discovered and photographed from the air by the U.S. Antarctic Service, 1939–41, and named by the Advisory Committee on Antarctic Names for Donald W. Bowyer, a United States Antarctic Research Program meteorologist at Byrd Station, 1962.

Hoyt Head forms the northeastern end of Bowyer Butte.

References 

Buttes of Antarctica
Landforms of Marie Byrd Land